Hill Street Blues is an American drama series that aired on NBC from January 15, 1981 until May 12, 1987. It was nominated for a variety of different awards and holds several notable all-time records. It was nominated for the most Primetime Emmy Award for Outstanding Supporting Actor in a Drama Series (16) and Primetime Emmy Award for Outstanding Supporting Actress in a Drama Series (13), and won the most Primetime Emmy Award for Outstanding Drama Series (4) as well as most combined Outstanding Drama Series, Primetime Emmy for Drama Writing, and Primetime Emmy for Drama Directing (10). In addition to these all-time records, it holds the record for single season regular cast (Drama Lead Actor, Drama Supporting Actor, Drama Lead Actress, and Drama Supporting Actress) acting nominations (9), as well as being the only series to sweep all five nominations in the Primetime Emmy Award for Outstanding Supporting Actor in a Drama Series in a single year. It is one of two shows to sweep all five nominations for Primetime Emmy for Drama Writing.

Its pilot episode, "Hill Street Station," was the only episode in television history to win both Primetime Emmy Award for Outstanding Directing for a Drama Series and Directors Guild of America Award for Outstanding Directing – Drama Series, as well as both Primetime Emmy Award for Outstanding Writing for a Drama Series and Writers Guild of America Award for Television: Episodic Drama.

At the 33rd Primetime Emmy Awards in 1981, Season 1 earned a record-setting total for a weekly series of 21 Primetime Emmy Award nominations, which was not surpassed until NYPD Blue earned 26 in 1994 with its first season. NYPD Blue also swept the five nominations for the writing category that year. NYPD Blue and Hill Street Blues shared the record for most Emmy nomination wins by a first year show with eight. In 1995, ER tied this record. In 2000, The West Wing would set the record for first season (or any season) with nine wins. The West Wing, L.A. Law, and Mad Men share the record of four Outstanding Drama Series wins with Hill Street Blues. Nine regular cast Emmy nominations is a record also shared with The West Wing and L.A. Law.

Directors Guild of America Awards

Edgar Awards

Emmy Awards

Primetime Emmy Awards

Creative Arts Emmy Awards

Golden Globe Awards

Humanitas Prize

Writers Guild of America Awards

Other awards

Artios Awards

Broadcasting Press Guild Awards

Eddie Awards

Image Awards

Peabody Awards

People's Choice Awards

TP de Oro, Spain

TV Land Awards

Television Critics Association Awards

Q Awards

References

External links
awards and nominations at IMDb.com

Hill Street Blues